There is a wide variety of museums in Guatemala, with collections varying from pre-Columbian Mesoamerican artefacts to Spanish colonial art and collections of regional interest.

Notes

References

External links
Museo del cacao y del chocolate - ChocoMuseo - Cacao and Chocolate museum in Antigua, Guatemala
Museo de los Niños - The Children's Museum official website 
Museo Nacional de Arqueología y Etnologíá - official website 
Museo Popol Vuh - official website 

Museums in Guatemala
Guatemala
Museums
Museums
Museums
Guatemala